Giovanni Petrucci (said Gianni; born 19 July 1945) is an Italian sports director. Born in Rome, Petrucci was the president of CONI for the fourth consecutive term that ended after the Games of the XXX Olympiad of 2012.

His career took place primarily between the Italian Football Federation (where he was special commissioner of the Italian Referees Association) and the Italian Basketball Federation (of which he was elected president in two consecutive occasions), before becoming on 29 January 1999, President of CONI, succeeding Bruno Grandi in the position in 1999. On 6 May 2009, has been reelected for his fourth consecutive term: he got 55 votes against 24 of the challenger, Franco Chimenti, president of FederGolf.

He was Special Commissioner of the FIGC in 2000–2001. On 7 May 2012, he was elected major of San Felice Circeo.

References

1945 births
Italian football chairmen and investors
Living people